KKGK (1340 kHz) is a commercial AM radio station in Las Vegas, Nevada, United States, serving the Las Vegas area. Owned by Lotus Communications, its studios and offices are located on West Flamingo Road in the unincorporated community of Spring Valley in Clark County. The transmitter is located off North Martin Luther King Boulevard in North Las Vegas. KKGK airs a sports radio format, mostly carrying the Fox Sports Radio Network. The syndicated "Dan Patrick Show" is heard on weekday mornings.

Programming is also heard on FM translator 98.9 K255CT in Henderson, Nevada.

History
In 1947, a license for a Las Vegas radio station at 1340 kHz was first applied for. But it took until 1951 for the station to first sign-on. KORK was owned by the Vegas Valley Broadcasting Company, located in the Hotel Thunderbird, and it was powered with only 250 watts. It was an NBC Radio Network affiliate, broadcasting a schedule of dramas, comedies, news, sports, game shows, soap operas and big band broadcasts. In 1955, it was bought by the Southwestern Broadcasting Company, which put Channel 3 KORK-TV (now KSNV) on the air in that same year. In 1961, KORK got an FM counterpart, 97.1 KORK-FM (now KXPT).

In 1968, KORK, airing a full service Middle of The Road format, moved to 920 kHz (today KRLV). Going to 920 allowed KORK to increase its daytime power to 5,000 watts. Meanwhile, Nevada Broadcasting, Incorporated, acquired the 1340 frequency, and began airing country music as 1340 KRAM. At this point, KRAM was powered at 1,000 watts by day, but still had to reduce power to 250 watts at night. It was an affiliate of the ABC Entertainment Radio Network.

In 1985, the station was acquired by Southern Nevada Radio, which changed the call sign to KMTW. By the early 1990s, 1340 KMTW had become an all-news station, carrying CNN Headline News.

In 1995, Far West Radio acquired the station. On August 9, the new owner changed its call sign to KRLV. It aired a talk radio format for several years. In 2004, Continental Broadcasting bought the station, putting on a Spanish-language format of music, news and sports.

In August 2012, KRLV and 1230 KLAV were sold to Lotus Communications. In April 2015, KRLV flipped from its Spanish-language format to Fox Sports Radio. The format change gave Lotus four sports-programmed stations in the Las Vegas Valley: 1100 KWWN (ESPN Radio), 920 KBAD (NBC Sports Radio), 1460 KENO (ESPN Deportes Radio in Spanish), and KRLV. The other sports station in Las Vegas is 1140 KXST (CBS Sports Radio).

In April 2017, Lotus acquired the radio rights to the Vegas Golden Knights of the National Hockey League, with KRLV serving as the flagship station. It was also announced that KLAV's FM translator K255CT would switch to a simulcast of KRLV on 98.9 FM. The call sign was changed to KKGK on March 20, 2020; the KRLV call sign moved to the former KBAD.

KKGK currently has rights to the Los Angeles Chargers radio network.

References

External links
FCC History Cards for KKGK

KGK
Radio stations established in 1951
Sports radio stations in the United States
1951 establishments in Nevada
Lotus Communications stations